The canton of Charleville-Mézières-1 is an administrative division of the Ardennes department, northern France. It was created at the French canton reorganisation which came into effect in March 2015. Its seat is in Charleville-Mézières.

It consists of the following communes:

Belval
Charleville-Mézières (partly)
Cliron
Fagnon
Haudrecy
Prix-lès-Mézières
Tournes
Warcq

References

Cantons of Ardennes (department)